Matane was a federal electoral district in Quebec, Canada, that was represented in the House of Commons of Canada from 1917 to 1935, and from 1968 to 1979.

This riding was created in 1914 from parts of Rimouski riding. It consisted of the part of the county of Rimouski east of the Métis River excluding the part of the parish of St. Angèle de Mérici east of the Métis River. In 1924, it was redefined to consist of the Counties of Matane and Matapédia.

The electoral district was abolished in 1933 when it was redistributed between Gaspé and Matapédia—Matane ridings.

It was recreated in 1966 from parts of those two ridings. The new riding consisted of:
 the Towns of Amqui and Matane;
 the County of Matane (except the village municipality of Price, the parish municipality of Saint-Octave-de-Métis, and the municipality of Grand-Métis);
 in the County of Gaspé West: the village municipality of Cap-Chat, the parish municipality of Saint-Norbert-du-Cap-Chat, the Townships of Cap-Chat and Romieu without local municipal organization; and
 in the County of Matapédia: the village municipalities of Causapscal and Lac-au-Saumon; the parish municipalities of Saint-Alexandre-des-Lacs, Saint-Benoît-Joseph-Labre, Saint-Damase, Saint-Jacques-le-Majeur-de-Causapscal, Saint-Jean-Baptiste-Vianney, Saint-Léon-le-Grand, Saint-Raphaël-d'Albertville, Saint-Tharcisius and Saint-Zénon-du-Lac-Humqui; the municipalities of Saint-Edmond, Sainte-Florence and Sainte-Marguerite; the territory without local municipal organization comprising the Townships of Casault, Catalogne, Clark, Gravier, part of the Townships of Blais, Jetté, La Vérendrye, Matalic, the Seigniory of Lac-Matapédia, and that part of the Seigniory of Lac-Mitis bounded on the northwest by the prolongation of the line separating the Townships of Nemtayé and Pinault to the southwestern limit of the County of Matapédia.

The electoral district was abolished in 1976 when it was redistributed into Gaspé, Matapédia—Matane and Bonaventure—Îles-de-la-Madeleine and ridings.

Members of Parliament

This riding elected the following Members of Parliament:

Election results

Matane, 1917–1935

Matane, 1968–1979

See also 

 List of Canadian federal electoral districts
 Past Canadian electoral districts

External links

Riding history from the Library of Parliament:
 (1914 - 1933)
(1966 - 1976)

Former federal electoral districts of Quebec